Robert Alexander Nader (March 31, 1928—March 15, 2019) was an American Democratic politician who served as a city councilman, state representative and judge in Ohio.

Early life

Nader was born in Warren, Ohio, the son of Nassef J. and Emily Nader, who were Lebanese immigrants
of Maronite Catholic heritage. He attended Warren G. Harding High School in Warren where he excelled
in football, earning recognition on the 1945 All-Ohio team. After his high school graduation in 1946 he
enrolled at The Ohio State University where he successfully walked on to the football team in spring
practice. He left Ohio State to enlist in the U.S. Army from 1946 to 1948, then attended Adelbert
College of Western Reserve University in Cleveland, graduating in 1950. He attended Western Reserve
Law School and graduated in 1953.

Political career

After graduation Nader went into the practice of law in Warren with his brother, Paul G. Nader. In 1960
he was elected at large to Warren City Council where he served until 1966. Beginning in 1971 he served
in the Ohio House of Representatives, representing the 98th — later the 55th — district. He continued as a
state representative until 1982, during which time he served as Chairman of the Judiciary and Reference
Committees.

Nader was then appointed and later elected as a Judge of the Trumbull County (Ohio) Common Pleas
Court which he served from 1982 until 1990, followed by an appointment and election as a Judge of the
11th District Court of Appeals, from which he retired in 2002. He served by assignment on the Ohio
Supreme Court on several occasions until 2007.

One of Nader's most noteworthy appellate opinions was written in dissent when a rehearing was
granted in the Ninth District Court of Appeals after that court had overturned a $212 million verdict
awarded in a business lawsuit, following claims that the judge who wrote the opinion had received large
campaign contributions over many years from the CEO of the winning party. The new appellate panel
refused to review the first appellate decision on procedural grounds. Nader dissented, writing that the
initial decision “was infected by approximately $1 million in contributions from a very financially
interested individual,” resulting in “a classic scenario giving rise to every nuance of political influence in
our courts which calls for self-disqualification.” This dissent was noted in a 2008 New York Times article
concerning the effects of campaign contributions on judges’ decisions.

Personal life

Nader married Nancy M. Veauthier, a career public school teacher, in 1975.
Nader was a founding member and patron of Trumbull New Theatre, and frequently acted in its
productions. He was active in many public and civic organizations, including the Family Service
Association, the City of Warren Police and Fire Pension Boards and Elks. His work for justice and reform
was recognized by multiple awards, including from the American Arbitration Association, Kent State
University Trumbull County, and the Children's Rehabilitation Center.

Robert A. Nader Trust

Nader established a trust which is directed, in part, to benefit the citizens of Trumbull County, Ohio and
the Mahoning Valley. The philanthropic activities of the Robert A Nader Family Trust include support of
local non-profit institutions and other charitable causes.

References

1928 births
2019 deaths
Democratic Party members of the Ohio House of Representatives
American people of Lebanese descent
American Maronites
People from Warren, Ohio